Song to Fly is the debut studio album by Yoko Kanno.  It was released January 1, 1998. All music was written by Yoko Kanno.

Track listing

Performers

1998 albums
Yoko Kanno albums
Victor Entertainment albums